Santa Maria della Stella (St Mary of the Stars)  is a Roman Catholic parish church located on Via Porta della Terra in Militello in Val di Catania in the region of Sicily, Italy.

History and Description

A church of the same name was mostly destroyed by the 1693 Sicily earthquake.  The remains of the prior church, including an elegant Renaissance and Romanesque portal, now an archeologic monument, are referred to as Santa Maria La Vetere. This new church was built at the prior site of the church of Sant'Antonio Abate, which was then also rebuilt adjacent. Construction or the present church took place from 1722 to 1741. The church with three naves separated by pillars, so as to strengthen the church against future earthquakes. 

The architect Giuseppe Ferrara designed and helped sculpt the richly articulated facade. The detached bell-tower was begun in 1773; however, it was never completed, and the stunted building only rises two stories. The main altarpiece, carved in 1753, displays a Nativity of the Virgin by Olivio Sozzi. The third altar on the left displays a Martyrdom of St. Bartholomew (1694), commissioned by the guild of the tanners, active in Militello, in honor of their patron saint. The fourth altar on right houses a glazed terracotta depicting the Nativity by Andrea della Robbia; this work was commissioned in 1487 by Antonio Pietro Barresi, baron of Militello, for the prior church of Santa Maria della Stella. A number of works from the churches ruined by the earthquake were reused, including a Scourged Christ (17th century) from the church of Sant'Antonio Abate; a portal likely from the prior Santa Maria church, and a sarcophagus for Blasco II Barresi (15th-century) and Vincenzo Barresi, first Marquis of Militello (1567). 

The church has a new chapel of the Madonna della Stella, patron saint of Militello, designed by Giuseppe Pagnano and built in the 1980s. Two bronze angels by Emilio Greco make up the doors of the marble doors. Giuseppe Barone painted the frescoes (1947) of the vault in the chapel of the Virgin of the Assumption.

References

18th-century Roman Catholic church buildings in Italy
 
Buildings and structures in the Province of Catania